Yenin is a surname. Notable people with the surname include:

 Artyom Yenin (born 1976), Russian footballer
 Ivan Yenin (born 1994), Ukrainian-Russian footballer
 Yevhen Yenin (1980–2023), Ukrainian diplomat and lawyer

See also
 Henin